FutureNever is the second studio album by the Australian musician Daniel Johns, released on 22 April 2022 by BMG Music Australia. It was announced in December 2021 and initially scheduled for release on 1 April 2022 until it was delayed to 22 April to include the song "Emergency Calls Only". Johns said that he did not want to release any singles before the album, as he intended it to "be enjoyed as an album". Johns missed his own album launch party due to crashing his car in a high-range DUI incident.

At the 2022 ARIA Music Awards, the album was nominated for Best Solo Artist.

Reception 

Andrew Trendell from NME wrote, "While there's a lot of Daniel Johns at his best here, this isn't The Best of Daniel Johns. There's rock bravado throughout, but you won't get a whiff of Frogstomp. Styles and eras clash, but Neon Ballroom it ain't. There is, however, a vulnerability, curiosity and adventure that makes FutureNever unmistakably Johns."

Track listing

Charts

Weekly charts

Year-end charts

References 

2022 debut albums
Daniel Johns albums
Eleven: A Music Company albums